Plectorhinchus gaterinus, commonly known as the blackspotted rubberlip or African grunt, is a species of marine ray-finned fish, a sweetlips belonging to the subfamily Plectorhinchinae, one of two subfamilies in the family Haemulidae, the grunts. It is found in the western Indian Ocean.

Description
Plectorhinchus gaterinus has fleshy lips but these do not have a swollen appearance. The chin has 6 pores but lacks a median pit. Its pelvic fins are longer than its pectoral fins. The predominant colour is yellowish grey with a greenish back and yellowish belly. The body and fins are marked with rows of dark grey or black-brown spots. The dorsal fin has 13 spines and 19-20 soft rays and the anal fin contains 3 spines and 7 soft rays.

Distribution
Plectorhinchus gaterinus is found in the Western Indian Ocean.  It occurs along the eastern coast of Africa from KwaZulu Natal north into the Red Sea as far north as the Gulf of Aqaba. It is also found in the Sea of Oman and the Persian Gulf and around the islands of the Seychelles, Mauritius, Madagascar, Réunion and Comoro Islands. A juvenile was recovered from the gut of a European squid (Loligo vulgaris) in the Aegean Sea which may indicate Lessepsian migration through the Suez Canal but this is thought unlikely.

Habitat and biology
It is frequently found in large aggregations below ledges or along reef slopes during the day. The juveniles often occur in beds of sea grass. They feed on mainly on smaller fishes and crustaceans. A spawning aggregation has been observed in the Persian Gulf off Kuwait. It is an oviparous species which spawns as distinct pairs.

Systematics
Plectorhinchus gaterinus was first formally described in 1775 as Sciaena gaterina by the Danish zoologist Johan Christian Fabricius with the type locality being Jeddah. Fishbase attributes the description to Peter Forskål but Catalog of Fishes suggests that Forskål published Fabricius's description posthumously in Descriptiones animalium which was in turn published after Forskål's death by Carsten Niebuhr.  The specific name gaterinus is derived from the local Arabic name for this species on the Red Sea coast of Saudi Arabia, .

Utilisation
Plectorhinchus gaterinus is fished throughout its range using handlines and gill nets and the catch is sold fresh. Catch statistics are not reported for this species. The flesh is nor regarded highly as it has an iodoform taste. The juveniles are fished for the aquarium trade.

References

External links
 Aquarium fishes
 Plectorhinchus gaterinus, blackspotted grunt, Blackspotted rubberlip, blackspotted rubberlips, photos, facts and physical characteristics
 

Fish of the Indian Ocean
Fish described in 1775
gaterinus
Taxa named by Peter Forsskål